Jagannatha Dasa (Kannada: ಜಗನ್ನಾಥ ದಾಸ) (1728–1809), a native of Manvi town in the Raichur district, Karnataka state, India, comes in the preceptorial line of Madhvacharya and is considered one of the notable Haridasa of Dvaita Vedanta of Madhva ("devotee of the Hindu god Vishnu") saint-poets of the Kannada language. He was also an accomplished scholar in the Sanskrit language.

Overview
For about a century after the departure of Vadirajatirtha (1480–1600), a noted saint-poet, the Haridasa devotional cult which propagated the  philosophy of Madhvacharya through lucid Kannada devotional songs, seemed to wane. The movement however revived in the 18th century under the guidance of Vijaya Dasa, this time centered on the holy town of Mantralayam in modern Andhra Pradesh and a large area covering the Raichur district in modern Karnataka. The poetry written by these later day saints closely followed the style established by the 15th- and 16th-century saints of the Haridasa cadre. The Haridasa contribution to Hindu mysticism and the  literature overall is similar to the contributions of the Alvars and Nayanmars of modern Tamil Nadu and that of the devotional saint-poets of Maharashtra and Gujarat. According to the scholar H.S. Shiva Prakash, about 300 saint-poets from this cadre enriched Kannada literature during the 18th and 19th centuries.

Sainthood
Legend has it that Jagannatha Dasa, born in a Deshastha Madhva Brahmin family whose birth name was Srinivasacharya (or Sinappa), was once invited by Vijaya Dasa, a noted Haridasa of the 18th century, to attend a religious ceremony at Manvi. The ceremony included dining with the devotees of Vijaya Dasa as well. Srinivasacharya, considering himself a renowned Sanskrit scholar, had developed an arrogance towards religious leaders who spread the  glory of the Lord in Kannada, which was noted by Srinivasacharya as a layman's language. He thus refused the invitation coldly, adding that if he had lunch later with the devotees and dasas, he would develop a stomach ache. Gopala Dasa heard of this behaviour and felt insulted by Srinivasacharya's reaction to their humble invitation and angrily cursed Srinivasacharya, wishing for his words to come true. Srinivasacharya fell ill and developed severe stomach pains. Unable to find relief, Srinivasacharya sought the help of Vijaya Dasa who asked him to meet his disciple Gopala Dasa. Srinivasacharya visited Gopala Dasa and was cured by him. Repentant for his attitude towards the Haridasas, Srinivasacharya became a disciple of Gopala Dasa and took to the Haridasa fold. These details are known from a song written by Jagananatha Dasa expressing his gratitide to Gopala Dasa and Vijaya Dasa.

Kannada literature
The  is a poem that treats on the philosophy of Madhvacharya and is considered his magnum opus and an important work by the  school. Written in the native  metre, it contains 32 chapters comprising 988 stanzas. Later day scholars wrote ten commentaries on this work, including a Sanskrit commentary in 1862 (by Sankarsana Odeyaru), an indication of its superior literary content. The , containing 1,200 pithy and proverbial poems of which 600 stanzas are available today, was written in the native  metre, in a simple style, and is known to have been a consolation to his young widowed daughter-in-law gopamma, wife of his son damodara dasa.

Notes

References

18th-century Indian philosophers
Madhva religious leaders
Dvaita Vedanta
Carnatic musicians
Haridasa
Scholars from Karnataka
1728 births
1809 deaths
Dvaitin philosophers
People from Raichur district
Musicians from Karnataka
18th-century Indian musicians
19th-century Indian musicians
19th-century Indian philosophers